Bill Clinton, the 42nd president of the United States, announced his candidacy for re-election as president on April 14, 1995. On August 29, 1996, he again became the nominee of the Democratic Party for the 1996 presidential election. Along with his running mate, Vice President Al Gore, Bill Clinton was opposed in the general election by former U.S. Senator Bob Dole of Kansas, minor candidates from other parties. The election took place on Tuesday, November 5, 1996.

This was the first time since 1944, when President Franklin D. Roosevelt won re-election, that a Democratic president had won two consecutive presidential elections.

Convention

The 1996 Democratic National Convention held in Chicago sparked protests, such as the one whereby Civil Rights Movement historian Randy Kryn and 10 others were arrested by the Federal Protective Service, and Clinton won the party's nomination.

Election and victory

The election took place on November 5, 1996 and ended with Clinton gaining 379 electoral votes and Dole garnering 159 electoral votes. 

With 379 electoral votes, President Bill Clinton won the 1996 presidential election.  Clinton received over 47 million popular votes.

See also
1996 Democratic Party presidential primaries
1996 Democratic National Convention
1996 United States presidential election
Bob Dole 1996 presidential campaign
Ross Perot 1996 presidential campaign

References

External links

Bill Clinton acceptance speech

Bill Clinton
Al Gore
Clinton, Bill
Clinton, Bill
Presidency of Bill Clinton